William Dressler (1890–1969) was a cardiologist born in Poland, who went on to become a Director of Cardiology at Maimonides Medical Center.

Dressler's syndrome is named after him for discovering the condition in 1956.

The "Dressler beat", a type of QRS complex, is also named after him.

References

Polish cardiologists
1890 births
1969 deaths
Cardiac arrhythmia
Polish emigrants to the United States